James Hayward is the pen name of James Nice (born 6 January 1966 in Essex), an English writer on military, modern art and post-punk musical history.

Biography
Hayward was educated at the University of Glasgow prior to working in music publishing at Les Disques du Crepuscule, and then as a solicitor.

Books by James Hayward include The Bodies on the Beach (2001), Shingle Street (2002), Myths and Legends of the First World War (2002), Myths and Legends of the Second World War (2003) and Double Agent Snow – The True Story of Arthur Owens, Hitler's Chief Spy in England (2013).

As James Hayward, he has also written liner notes for several audiobook CDs including Artists' Rifles 1914-18, Memorial Tablet (Siegfried Sassoon), Oh! It's a Lovely War (4 volumes), British War Broadcasting 1938-1946, RAF Bomber Command at War (2 volumes), The Battle of Britain, D-Day and the Battle for Normandy, Futurism & Dada Reviewed, Voices of Dada, Surrealism Reviewed, Musica Futurista, Cocteau Satie & Les Six, Bauhaus Reviewed, Wyndham Lewis: The Enemy Speaks, Futurlieder and A Young Person's Guide to the Avant-Garde.

As James Nice, he made the 2006 documentary film Shadowplayers, a history of the Factory Records label, and wrote the 2010 book Shadowplayers: The Rise and Fall of Factory Records. He runs the record labels LTM Recordings, Factory Benelux and Les Disques du Crépuscule.

Publications

As James Hayward

As James Nice

References

External links
The Bodies on the Beach at the BBC
 James Nice at Library of Congress Authorities 
 

WARNING: Both WorldCat pages confuse multiple writers named James Hayward.

1966 births
Living people
English male non-fiction writers
Writers from Essex